Deborah Kay Morrison is an American cell biologist who is the chief of the Laboratory of Cell and Developmental Signaling at the National Cancer Institute. She conducts research characterizing the RAS pathway and the RAF family kinases and leads efforts to design  new therapeutic strategies for cancer treatment.

Education 
Morrison completed a Ph.D. from Vanderbilt University School of Medicine. Her 1985 dissertation was titled Characterization of the virion-associated RNA polymerase of rabbit poxvirus using monoclonal antibodies. She then began studying signal transduction as a postdoctoral fellow in the laboratories of Thomas M. Roberts at Harvard Medical School and Lewis T. Williams at the University of California, San Francisco.

Career and Research 
Morrison joined the ABL-Basic Research Program in 1990 and became head of the Cellular Growth Mechanisms Section in 1995. From 1996 to 1997, she was on sabbatical in the laboratory of Gerald M. Rubin at the University of California, Berkeley.

Morrison joined the National Cancer Institute's (NCI) Center for Cancer Research in 1999 and became chief of the Laboratory of Cell and Developmental Signaling in 2006. She is a leader in the study of the RAF kinases. Her work has provided insights into the biochemical and structural basis of RAF activation and has guided the design of new therapeutic strategies.

Awards and Honors  
In 2013 and 2021, Morrison received the NIH Director's Award for her breakthroughs in cancer research. In 2022, Morrison was elected a member of the National Academy of Sciences.

See also 

 List of Vanderbilt University people

References 

Living people
Year of birth missing (living people)
Place of birth missing (living people)
21st-century American women scientists
Vanderbilt University School of Medicine alumni
National Institutes of Health people
Cancer researchers
Cell biologists
21st-century American biologists
American women biologists
American medical researchers
Women medical researchers